In season 2011-12 Red Star Belgrade were competing in Serbian SuperLiga, Serbian Cup and UEFA Europa League.

Previous season positions
The club competed in Serbian SuperLiga, Serbian Cup in domestic and UEFA Europa League in European competitions. Finishing 2nd in domestic league, behind Partizan, reached semi-final of domestic cup where they lost to Partizan, and losing to Slovak cup winners Slovan Bratislava in third qualifying round for UEFA Europa League.

Kit
Red Star Belgrade players will wear a kit made by Nike for the 2011–12 season. The home colors are of a typical Red-White design similar to the one that was worn the previous season. The Away Kit is also similar to the previous season's kit.

Players

Squad statistics

1 These players also hold Serbian citizenship.

Top scorers
Includes all competitive matches. The list is sorted by shirt number when total goals are equal.

Updated 16 May 2012

Player transfer

In 

Total Expenditure:  2.143M €

Out 

Total Income:  5.290M €

Competitions

Serbian SuperLiga

Red Star Belgrade competed with 15 other teams in the 6th season of Serbian SuperLiga. They finished second, for a third time in a row, behind Partizan

League table

Results and positions by round

Results

Kickoff times are in CET.

Serbian Cup

Red Star Belgrade participated in the 6th Serbian Cup starting in the Round of 32. They won competition beating Borac Čačak in final.

Round of 32

Round of 16

Quarter-finals

Semi finals

Final

UEFA Europa League

By finishing second in the 2010-11 Serbian SuperLiga, Red Star Belgrade qualified for the Europa League. They started in the third qualifying round against Latvian side Ventspils, and were eliminated in Play-off round by French side Stade Rennais.

Third qualifying round

Play-off round

References

External links
 Official Website
 UEFA

2011-12
Red Star Belgrade season
Red Star